is the 11th studio album by Japanese singer-songwriter Miyuki Nakajima, released in October 1984.

Track listing
All songs written and composed by Miyuki Nakajima.
"" – 5:27
"" – 3:03
"" [album version] – 5:03
"" – 4:41
"" – 4:38
"" – 5:15
"" – 4:18
"" – 5:09
"" – 5:15
" – 4:38

Chart positions

References

1984 albums
Miyuki Nakajima albums